Aly Hussein (born 25 March 2000 in Cairo) is an Egyptian professional squash player. As of June 2021, he was ranked number 161 in the world.

References

2000 births
Living people
Egyptian male squash players
21st-century Egyptian people